Chayenne Pereira da Silva (born 5 February 2000) is a Brazilian athlete specialising in the 400 metres hurdles. She won a bronze medal at the 2021 South American Championships. She competed at the 2020 Summer Olympics.

Her personal best in the event is 55.15 seconds set in São Paulo in 2021. This the current South American record.

International competitions

References

External links

2000 births
Living people
Brazilian female hurdlers
People from Nova Iguaçu
Athletes (track and field) at the 2020 Summer Olympics
Olympic athletes of Brazil
Sportspeople from Rio de Janeiro (state)
21st-century Brazilian women